Ringo Starr is an English musician who has recorded hundreds of songs throughout his long career. As the drummer for the Beatles, Starr occasionally performed lead vocals, usually for one song an album. He wrote two songs for the group, "Don't Pass Me By" and "Octopus's Garden", and was credited as co-writer of others, including "What Goes On" and "Flying". Before their break-up in April 1970, he released his debut solo album, the George Martin-produced Sentimental Journey in March 1970, which contained cover songs each arranged by a different musician. He followed it in September 1970 with the Pete Drake-produced Beaucoups of Blues, which contained songs influenced by country music. Starr then collaborated with former bandmate George Harrison for the singles "It Don't Come Easy" (1971) and "Back Off Boogaloo" (1972), the latter of which Starr re-recorded twice in 1981 and 2017.

In 1973, Starr released the pop album Ringo, which featured an array of guest collaborators, including producer Richard Perry, his future co-writer Vini Poncia ("Oh My My"), and all former Beatles: Harrison ("Photograph"), John Lennon ("I'm the Greatest") and Paul McCartney ("Six O'Clock"). Starr's follow-up album, Goodnight Vienna (1974), featured many of the same collaborators as its predecessor, including Perry, Poncia, Lennon ("(It's All Down to) Goodnight Vienna"), as well as Elton John ("Snookeroo"), Billy Preston and Harry Nilsson ("Easy for Me"). Ringo's Rotogravure (1976) was his first to be produced by Arif Mardin and again featured contributions from Lennon ("Cookin' (In the Kitchen of Love)"), Harrison ("I'll Still Love You") and McCartney ("Pure Gold"), as well as Eric Clapton ("This Be Called a Song"). Starr ended the 1970s with the more disco-oriented Ringo the 4th (1977) and the rock album Bad Boy (1978), which both featured fewer celebrity contributors than his earlier releases; Starr ended his partnership with Poncia following these releases.

Starr's two releases of the 1980s were Stop and Smell the Roses (1981), which featured several guests like his earlier albums, including McCartney, Harrison, Nilsson, Ronnie Wood and Stephen Stills, and the Joe Walsh-produced Old Wave (1983). At the end of the 1980s, Starr began recording with his All-Starr Band, which, over many different iterations, features Starr and an assortment of musicians who had been successful in their own right with popular songs at different times. He continued to make music throughout the 1990s, contributing "You Never Know" to the soundtrack of Curly Sue (1991), releasing Time Takes Time (1992), Vertical Man (1998), which marked the beginning of his partnership with Mark Hudson, and the Christmas album I Wanna Be Santa Claus (1999). Starr's first album of the 2000s was Ringo Rama (2003), which featured contributions from Clapton, David Gilmour and Gary Burr, as well as the song "Never Without You", a tribute to Harrison, who died in late 2001. He continued his collaboration with Hudson with Choose Love (2005), whose title track featured references to several Beatles songs, ending it with Liverpool 8 in 2008. Starr has continued to release music since the 2010s. He recorded "Walk with You" with McCartney in 2010 and has released multiple re-recordings of earlier songs, including "Step Lightly" and "Wings" on Ringo 2012, and "You Can't Fight Lightning", "Photograph" and his Beatles song "Don't Pass Me By" on 2017's Give More Love. What's My Name (2019) featured past collaborators Walsh and McCartney, who guest starred on a cover of "Grow Old with Me", one of the final songs written by John Lennon. Starr released the EPs Zoom In and Change the World in 2021.

Songs

See also
List of songs recorded by the Beatles

Notes

References

Sources

 
 
 

 
 

Ringo Starr

Starr, Ringo